The 4th Society of Texas Film Critics Awards were given by the Society of Texas Film Critics (STFC) on December 29, 1997. Founded in 1994, the Society of Texas Film Critics members included film critics working for print and broadcast outlets across the state of Texas.

Winners
 Best Film:
 The Sweet Hereafter 
 Best Director:
 Atom Egoyan – The Sweet Hereafter
 Best Actor:
 Robert Duvall – The Apostle
 Best Actress:
 Helena Bonham Carter – The Wings of the Dove
 Best Supporting Actor:
 Kevin Spacey – L.A. Confidential and Midnight in the Garden of Good and Evil
 Best Supporting Actress:
 Joan Cusack – In & Out
 Best Original Screenplay:
 In the Company of Men – Neil LaBute
 Best Adapted Screenplay:
 L.A. Confidential – Brian Helgeland and Curtis Hanson
 Best Foreign Language Film:
 Shall We Dance? (Shall we dansu?) – Japan
 Best Documentary Feature:
 Fast, Cheap & Out of Control

References

1997
1997 film awards